Leyton and Wanstead is a constituency created in 1997 and represented in the House of Commons of the UK Parliament since 2010 by John Cryer of the Labour Party.

Boundaries 

Uniting for general elections areas from the boroughs of Redbridge and Waltham Forest in inner north-east London, the constituency covers Leyton, Wanstead & Leytonstone.  The seat was created for the 1997 election succeeding the Leyton constituency, with parts of what had been the formerly safe Conservative Wanstead and Woodford constituency.  It has an electorate of approximately 60,000.

The seat has electoral wards:
Snaresbrook; and Wanstead in the London Borough of Redbridge:
Cann Hall;  Cathall; Forest; Grove Green; Leyton; and Leytonstone in the London Borough of Waltham Forest

History
The seat arose from the enacting of the recommendations of the fourth periodic review of Westminster constituencies of the Boundary Commission for England to take account of demographic population change and seek to equalise electorates whilst in preference retaining the historic connections with the local authorities of the United Kingdom.
Political history
The constituency has consistently elected Labour Party MPs (Members of Parliament); the narrowest winning majority was 16%; the greatest, 49%, in 2017. Harry Cohen was MP for the Leyton area from 1983 and this seat from 1997. Cohen retired before the 2010 election, after which the seat was retained by John Cryer.  At the time of the 2015 result, the seat was the 46th safest of Labour's 232 seats by percentage of majority.

Constituency profile 
This seat combines deprived and economic-cycle vulnerable areas around Leyton with the more affluent, resilient Wanstead area. It is an ethnically diverse area, with the biggest minority groups being Pakistani British and Caribbean British, although it has fewer ethnic minority constituents than in the London Borough of Newham.

Members of Parliament

Elections

Elections in the 2010s

Elections in the 2000s

Elections in the 1990s

See also 
 List of parliamentary constituencies in London

Notes

References

External links 
Politics Resources (Election results from 1922 onwards)
Electoral Calculus (Election results from 1955 onwards)
BBC constituency profile

Politics of the London Borough of Waltham Forest
Politics of the London Borough of Redbridge
Parliamentary constituencies in London
Constituencies of the Parliament of the United Kingdom established in 1997